Trần Văn Đỗ (15 November 1903 – 20 December 1990) was a South Vietnamese intellectual and politician who served in both the governments of the State of Vietnam and South Vietnam as Minister of Foreign Affairs and Deputy Prime Minister of South Vietnam. He was the younger brother of Trần Văn Chương, who served as the South Vietnamese ambassador to the United States in the early 1960s under the government of South Vietnam's first President Ngô Đình Diệm. He was also the uncle of then South Vietnam's First Lady Trần Lệ Xuân, commonly known as Madame Nhu. He was an outspoken critic of the Diệm's government, and in 1960, he was one of the main drafters of the Caravelle Manifesto, a public document, supported by many political factions of the South Vietnamese government demanding reform within Diệm's government.

Early life
He was born on 15 November 1903 in Phủ Lý, Tonkin, French Indochina. He studied in France, obtained a medical doctor degree from the University of Paris.

Political career
He decided not to sign the Geneva Agreement because he did not accept the division of Vietnam and on behalf of the Vietnamese National Delegation issued a separate statement:

"...the Vietnamese government requests the Conference to officially acknowledge that Vietnam solemnly opposes the signing of the Agreement and its provisions that do not respect the deep aspirations of the Vietnamese people. Request the Conference to acknowledge that the Government grants itself the right to complete freedom of action to protect the sacred rights of the Vietnamese people in the process of realizing Unification, Independence, and Freedom for the country."

He was then appointed Minister of Foreign Affairs, but after only one year, withdrew in 1955. During the First Republic, he opposed President Ngô Đình Diệm's policies. He was one of 18 members of the Caravelle group to sign the petition, also known as the Caravelle Declaration to Ngô Đình Diệm, demanding government reform in April 1960.

In 1965, he served as Deputy Prime Minister in the cabinet of Prime Minister Phan Huy Quát and Minister of Foreign Affairs. After the premiership of Phan Huy Quát ended, he stepped down as Deputy Prime Minister, but continue on to serve as Minister of Foreign Affairs (1965–1968) under the premiership of Prime Ministers Nguyễn Cao Kỳ and Nguyễn Văn Lộc.

Life in exile
After the Fall of Saigon, he took asylum in France as a political refugee where lived quietly for the remainder of his life. He died on 20 December 1990, in Paris.

References

1903 births
1990 deaths
South Vietnamese politicians